Simon Williams may refer to:

Simon Williams (actor) (born 1946), English actor best known for playing James Bellamy in Upstairs, Downstairs
Simon Williams (athlete) (born 1967), English shot put and discus athlete
Simon Williams (sociologist) (born 1961), professor of sociology at the University of Warwick
Simon Williams (bassist) (born 1973), bassist and backup singer to ska-punk band Goldfinger
Simon Williams (chess player) (born 1979), English chess player, grandmaster
Simon Williams (cricketer) (born 1970), former English cricketer
Simon Williams (Royal Navy officer)
Simon Channing Williams (1945–2009), British film producer
Simon Williams (artist) (born 1973), Welsh comic artist
Simon Williams (rugby league) (born 1989), rugby league player
Simon Williams (weightlifter) (born 1920), Jamaican Olympic weightlifter
Simon Williams, the real name of Marvel Comics superhero Wonder Man